Gabriella Machado e Silva (born December 12, 1988 in Rio de Janeiro, Brazil) is a Brazilian butterfly swimmer and Olympian. As of October 2008, she was the South American and Brazilian record holder in the long-course 100-metre butterfly.

At the 2007 Pan American Games, in Rio de Janeiro, Gabriella won the bronze medal in the 100-metre butterfly. She also won bronze in the 4×100-metre medley  by participate in heats, but, subsequently, this result was impeached due to Rebeca Gusmao's doping.

Gabriella competed at the 2008 Olympics in Beijing, where she finished 7th in the Women's 100-metre butterfly, and was a member of Brazil's women's 4×100-metre medley Relay which finished 10th.

At the 2009 World Aquatics Championships in Rome, Gabriella Silva finished in 5th place in the 100-metre butterfly, getting the best placement of a Brazilian woman in the World Championships. She was also a finalist in the 4×100-metre medley, finishing in 8th place and finished 13th place in the 50-metre butterfly.

She was at the 2010 Pan Pacific Swimming Championships in Irvine, where she finished 5th in the 50-metre butterfly, and 15th in the 100-metre butterfly.

At the 2011 Pan American Games, in Guadalajara, Gabriella finished 10th in the 100-metre butterfly, not going to the final.

Early Retirement 
After the 2009 World Aquatics Championships in Rome, she did two operations on her shoulders to fix a "looseness in the joint capsule of the left shoulder" (congenital), and never managed to get good results as before. So, in January 2013, at age 24, defeated by the pains and injuries, she announced her retirement.

Records 
 Long course (50 meters)
 Former South American record holder at 50m butterfly: 26.02, obtained on July 31, 2009
 South American record holder at 100m butterfly: 56.94, obtained on July 27, 2009
 South American record holder at 4 × 100 m medley: 3:58.49 obtained on August 1, 2009 with Fabiola Molina, Carolina Mussi and Tatiana Lemos

 Short course (25 meters)
 Former South American record holder at 100m butterfly: 58.75, obtained on November 15, 2008
 South American record holder at 50m butterfly: 25.93 obtained on September 12, 2010

See also
List of South American records in swimming
List of Brazilian records in swimming

References
 
 2008 Olympics profile

1988 births
Living people
Brazilian female butterfly swimmers
Olympic swimmers of Brazil
Swimmers at the 2008 Summer Olympics
Swimmers at the 2007 Pan American Games
Swimmers at the 2011 Pan American Games
Swimmers from Rio de Janeiro (city)
Pan American Games bronze medalists for Brazil
Pan American Games medalists in swimming
South American Games gold medalists for Brazil
South American Games medalists in swimming
Competitors at the 2006 South American Games
Medalists at the 2007 Pan American Games
21st-century Brazilian women
20th-century Brazilian women